Neviano degli Arduini is a comune (municipality) in the Province of Parma in the Italian region Emilia-Romagna, located about  west of Bologna and about  south of Parma.

In the communal territory is the Romanesque Pieve di Sasso, a national monument. This stone pieve (parish church) was built in the 11th century. Its reconstruction around 1080 is traditionally attributed to Matilda of Tuscany. It is a church with a nave and two aisles, built in rough stone. Notable is the façade, parted by thin pilasters and a medieval portal. It houses a sculpted baptismal font with octagonal plan, and figures of the Evangelists. Other notable buildings include the church of Sant'Ambrogio a Bazzano.

Twin towns
 Tarascon, France

References

External links
 Official website

Cities and towns in Emilia-Romagna